Fish Tales is a 1936 Warner Bros. Looney Tunes short film directed by Jack King. The short was released on May 23, 1936, and stars Porky Pig.

Plot
Porky Pig goes fishing, and two worms come out of their hole following Porky to his boat. Porky indicates that he wants the worms to go into the can. The first worm immediately hops into the can, and the second worm who is portrayed as a woman with gloves and high heels, is at first coy, but gets hauled inside. Porky starts the engine, and the boat goes crazy, speeding towards the ocean. The boat is running straight at a battleship, but goes down and up from the ocean under the ship. On the way back, the boat crashes inside the ship filled with Navy sailors and splits the dinner table in half. The boat exits the battle ship, which subsequently sinks. Porky manages to stop the boat, gets out his fishing rod, and after a few unsuccessful attempts starts fishing. Porky catches a fish head trophy and he throws it out.

He catches a bunch of fish, puts them in bucket, after which he feels tired and yawns. He arranges his rope as a pillow and goes to sleep, having a dream. In Porky's dream, an anthropomorphic fish portrayed as a hunter, is getting a fishing rod gun ready and is firing it towards Porky on the boat. Porky wakes up in the dream, and finds a ring shaped like a doughnut. He grabs the doughnut, but is caught by it, and is reeled in by the hunting fish. The fish carries Porky to his house underwater where his two fish kids and a fish wife awaits him.

The fish hunter presents Porky hanging upside down, and the kids begin laughing and get scared, as when touched, Porky acts like a fish. The fish hunter carries Porky to the kitchen, and uses a knife to cut Porky's shirt until he's naked, putting Porky into a pan and adding pepper, carrots, potatoes and an apple to put on Porky's mouth, after which he puts Porky into an oven. Inside the oven, a couple of flames are dancing around the pan, and Porky feels suffocated while coughing and he cries, "let me outta here!" Porky escapes the oven, and begins running away from the house. He encounters an eel, a giant fish, and a swordfish, and is caught by an octopus that entangles him. Porky wakes up still naked and tangled in rope, and begins throwing everything into the water, starts up the boat, and drives away.

References

External links
 

1936 films
1936 animated films
Films scored by Norman Spencer (composer)
Films directed by Jack King
Porky Pig films
Looney Tunes shorts
Animated films without speech
American black-and-white films
1930s American films